Eagle Cove is a small cove immediately west of Seal Point along the south side of Hope Bay, at the northeast end of the Antarctic Peninsula. It was discovered by J. Gunnar Andersson's party of the Swedish Antarctic Expedition, 1901–04, who wintered at Hope Bay in 1903. It was named by the Falkland Islands Dependencies Survey (FIDS) after the ship Eagle, which participated in the establishment of the FIDS base at Hope Bay in 1945.

References 

Coves of Graham Land
Landforms of Trinity Peninsula